Theo Breuer (born 30 March 1956) is a German poet, essayist, editor, translator and publisher.

Life and work 
Theo Breuer was born in Bürvenich, North Rhine-Westphalia, West Germany and educated at Cologne University where he studied German and English linguistics and literature. He has written many books of poetry and essays on contemporary literature since 1988.

In collaboration with artists and poets in Canada, England, Italy, Japan, the US and many other countries, he has published experimental and visual poetry. In 2007, Redfoxpress (Dugort, Achill Island, County Mayo, Ireland) published Word Theatre, a selection of Breuer's visual poetry. Breuer has participated in numerous mail art projects since 1991 together with artists such as Ryosuke Cohen, Guillermo Deisler, David Dellafiora or György Galántai. He has written a number of long essays and monographs exploring the widely-ramifying possibilities of literary expression  and verse-forms since 1989 and portraying poets such as Hans Bender, Thomas Bernhard,  Rolf Dieter Brinkmann, Michael Hamburger, Ernst Jandl, Thomas Kling, Friederike Mayröcker, W. G. Sebald and plenty of others.

Theo Breuer's poems have been translated into Arabic, English, French, Georgian, Italian, Polish, Romanian and Russian and published in numerous national and international anthologies, calendars, catalogues, literary magazines, and the Internet. He has translated two books of poetry by Richard Berengarten (aka Richard Burns) into German: Tree (Baum, 1989) and Black Light (Schwarzes Licht, 1996). In 2009 he participated in Richard Berengarten, Volta: A Multilingual Anthology, issue 9 of The International Literary Quarterly (London).

At his small press, Edition YE, which he founded in 1993, Breuer has also published the poetry magazine Faltblatt (Flyer), the YE international anthology series, an assemblage with original art and handwritten poetry containing original works by approx. 300 authors and artists from 28 countries, among others John M. Bennett, Guillermo Deisler, or Michael Leigh, and a series of contemporary German poets.

As editor of an annual anthology of handwritten poetry he has collected original autographs by well-known poets such as Hans Bender, Richard Berengarten, Günter Kunert, Walter Helmut Fritz, Michael Hamburger and many more. Each issue of these hand-bound artists' books also contains original art by contemporary international artists.

As permanent freelancer of the German annual Muschelhaufen (edited by Erik Martin) from 1994–2008 Breuer contributed essays and reviews on mail art, contemporary poetry and prose as well as portraits on coeval authors and small presses.

A fabulous reader not only of his own poetry, Breuer presents overviews of German poetry from the beginnings in the Middle Ages up to the present in the 21st century.

Theo Breuer lives in the village of Sistig (municipality Kall) in the Eifel National Park near the Belgian border.

Publications (selection)

Poetry 
 nicht weniger nicht mehr, 2021.
 Scherben saufen, 2019.
 Das gewonnene Alphabet, 2012.
 Wortlos (Wordless), 2009.
 Word Theatre. Visual Poetry, 2007.
 Nacht im Kreuz. (Night in the Cross), 2006.
 Land Stadt Flucht (Country City Getaway), 2002.
 Alpha und Omega und (Alpha and Omega and), 1998.
 Das letzte Wort hat Brinkmann (Brinkmann Has the Final Say), 1996.
 m%nday, 1996.
 Black Box. Visual Poetry, 1995.
 Der blaue Schmetterling (The Blue Butterfly), 1994.
 Mittendrin (Right in the Middle), 1991.
 Eifeleien (Eifel Poems), 1988.

Monographs 
 Winterbienen im Urftland. Empfundene/erfundene Welten in Norbert Scheuers Gedichten und Geschichten, 2019.
 Zischender Zustand. Mayröcker Time, 2017.
 Kiesel & Kastanie. Von neuen Gedichten und Geschichten] (Pebble and Chestnut: New Poems and Prose), 2008.
 Aus dem Hinterland. Lyrik nach 2000] (From the Hinterland: Poetry Since 2000), 2005.
 Ohne Punkt & Komma: Lyrik in den 90er Jahren (Without Full Stop & Comma: Poetry in the Nineties), 1999.

References 
 Kürschners Deutscher Literatur-Kalender, Saur, München 2010.
 Matthias Hagedorn: Wortlos und andere Gedichte. Zu Wort kommen lassen. Eine Würdigung des Lyrikers, Herausgebers und Verlegers Theo Breuer. In: Süddeutsche Zeitung vom 18. Januar 2009. .
 Andreas Noga: Wortlos und andere Gedichte, Poetenladen, Leipzig 2009 .
 Christoph Leisten: Poetisches Denkmal für das mittelgebirgische Dorf. Zu Theo Breuers Gedichtband »Land Stadt Flucht«. In: Der Dreischneuß. Halbjahresschrift für Literatur, Lübeck 2003.
 Heinz Ludwig Arnold und Jörgen Schäfer (Hg.), Popliteratur, edition text + kritik, München 2003.
 Das Kölner Autorenlexikon 1750–2000. Zweiter Band 1900–2000, Emons, Köln 2002.

Notes

External links 
 Literaturport 
 
 Theo Breuer at Poetenladen (Poets’ Shop) 
 Review Aus dem Hinterland. Lyrik nach 2000 (From the Hinterland: Poetry Since 2000) 
 Review Kiesel & Kastanie. Von neuen Gedichten und Geschichten (Pebble and Chestnut: New Poetry and Prose) 
 Theo Breuer: Mail Art  In: Wandler. Zeitschrift für Literatur. Vol. 18
 Matthias Hagedorn: Aus dem Hinterland 

1956 births
Living people
People from Euskirchen (district)
German poets
German essayists
Writers from North Rhine-Westphalia
German literary critics
German translators
German editors
German male essayists
German male poets
German-language poets